W.Y. Boyd Literary Award for Excellence in Military Fiction is awarded annually by the American Library Association for "the best fiction set in a period when the United States was at war." The award intends to recognize "the service of American veterans and military personnel."  It was funded by William Young Boyd II.

References

American literary awards
Military literary awards
English-language literary awards